Północ (lit. North) is one of four districts (Polish: dzielnica) of Szczecin, Poland situated in northern part of the city. As of January 2011 it had a population of 54,004.

Północ is divided into 9 municipal neighbourhoods: 
 Bukowo
 Golęcino-Gocław
 Niebuszewo
 Skolwin
 Stołczyn
 Warszewo
 Żelechowa

References

Neighbourhoods of Szczecin